Pali is an Indian village in the NIT area of Faridabad city of Faridabad district under Faridabad Lok Sabha constituency of Haryana state, well known for being biggest crusher zone of Asia, that also has a seasonal waterfall. It is the part of the Northern Aravalli leopard wildlife corridor, an important wildlife corridor which starts from the Sariska National Park in Rajasthan, passes through Nuh, Faridabad and Gurugram districts of Haryana and ends at Delhi Ridge.

Climate
The area had become polluted due to the stone crushers and dyeing units in the area, which were shut down by the environmentalist non-governmental organizations.  The main ecological issues are illegal mining, desertification, deforestation, encroachment and land grabbing of common Panchayat forest and grazing land called "bani".

Tourism
Historical place around sanctuary are Badkhal Lake (6 km northeast), 10th century ancient Surajkund reservoir (15 km north) and Anangpur Dam (16 km north), Damdama Lake, Tughlaqabad Fort and Adilabad ruins (both in Delhi), Chhatarpur Temple (in Delhi). There are several dozen lakes formed in the abandoned open pit mines in and around the sanctuary. It is contiguous to the scared Mangar Bani and the Asola Bhatti Wildlife Sanctuary. In the Pali village itself, the tourist area is being developed around the waterfall and nearby temple by constructing two dams and a herbal park. This hilly forested area of  Southern Delhi Ridge contains one of the last surviving remnants of Delhi Ridge hill range and its semi-arid forest habitat and its dependent wildlife. Once the whole Delhi Ridge was a forested area, but development has destroyed several parts of it.

Waterfalls

Pali monsoon waterfalls, Dhauj monsoon waterfalls, Kot monsoon waterfalls, collectively called Faridabad monsoon waterfalls are several dozen seasonal monsoon waterfalls in the Aravalli range in the Pali, Dhuaj and Pali villages respectively. These are situated just west of the NIT industrial area on the outskirts of Faridabad. Next to one of the waterfall in Pali is a Hindu temple, both temple and waterfall are venerated by the local people.

Dam

Pali twin dams, approved in 2019 and to be developed at the cost of INR70 lakhs, are two dams in the Aravalli hills to capture the water from the monsoon waterfalls. West of Pali Jharna Mandir there are at least two dozen lakes formed in the abandoned open pit mines.

Herbal park 

Pali herbal park will be developed near the waterfall and dam to boost the tourism.

Jharna temple

Jharna Mandir Pali Bani northeast of Pali village, is a temple next to the seasonal Pali waterfall in the forested aravalli hills called "Pali Bani", the temple takes its name Jharna (waterfall) from the Pali waterfall, both the temple and waterfall are venerated by the local people.

See also
 Faridabad district
 Tourism in Haryana
 National Parks & Wildlife Sanctuaries of Haryana

References

External links
pin code
 Haryana Government e-Services
 Save Aravali 
 Faridabad District Website
 e-Disha e-services
 Government of India e-services

Villages in Faridabad district
Archaeological sites in Haryana